The men's triple jump event at the 1967 Pan American Games was held in Winnipeg on 1 August.

Results

References

Athletics at the 1967 Pan American Games
1967